Agar.io is a massively multiplayer online action game created by Brazilian developer Matheus Valadares. Players control one or more circular cells in a map representing a Petri dish. The goal is to gain as much mass as possible by eating agar and cells smaller than the player's cell while avoiding larger ones which can eat the player's cells. Each player starts with one cell, but players can split a cell into two once it reaches a sufficient mass, allowing them to control multiple cells. The name comes from the substance agar, used to culture bacteria.

The game was released to positive critical reception; critics particularly praised its simplicity, competition, and mechanics, while criticism targeted its repetitive gameplay. Largely due to word of mouth on social networks, it was a quick success, becoming one of the most popular browser and mobile games in its first year. A Steam version was announced on 3 May 2015 but was never released, while the mobile version of Agar.io for iOS and Android was released on 24 July 2015 by Miniclip. Agar.io has inspired similar web games called ".io games", including games with a similar objective but different characters, and games that incorporate elements of other genres like shooter games.

Gameplay

The objective of Agar.io is to grow a cell on a Petri dish by swallowing both randomly generated pellets, known as "agar", which slightly increases a cell's mass, and smaller cells, without being swallowed by even larger cells. The browser version currently holds five game modes: FFA (Free-For-All), Battle Royale, Teams, Experimental, and Party. The mobile version of the game includes Classic (like FFA), Rush Mode, and Battle Royale. The goal of the game is to obtain the largest cell; players must restart from a small cell when all their cells are eaten by larger players or fountain viruses. Players can change their cell's appearance with predefined words, phrases, symbols, or skins. The more mass a cell has, the more slowly it will move. Cells will gradually lose a small amount of mass over time.

Viruses are green, spiky circles that split cells that consume them into many smaller cells, rendering them vulnerable and attractive targets to other players. Players can hide under viruses if their cell is small enough and their name short enough. Viruses are normally randomly generated, but players can also cause viruses to split in two by "feeding" them mass—typically in the direction of another nearby cell which the player wants to consume.

Players can split their cell into two, and one of the two evenly divided cells (if the mass of the original cell is odd, one cell will be slightly bigger than the other) will be shot in the direction of the cursor when the space bar was pressed. This can be used as a ranged attack to shoot a cell in order to swallow other smaller cells or to escape an attack and move quickly around the map. Split cells merge back into one cell if a bigger cell of the same player consumes it. Aside from feeding viruses, players can release a small fraction of their mass to feed other cells, an action commonly recognized as an intention to team with another player.

Development
Agar.io was announced on 4chan on 28 April 2015 by Matheus Valadares, a 19-year-old Brazilian developer, after completing "voar.io", a similar game that involved spaceships orbiting the Earth. Written in JavaScript and C++, the game was developed in a few days. The game originally did not have a name, and users had to connect to Valadares' IP addresses in order to play. The name Agar.io was suggested by an anonymous user on 4chan, as other domain names such as cell.io were already taken. Valadares continued updating and adding new features to the game, such as an experience system and an "experimental" game mode for testing experimental features. One week later, Agar.io entered Steam Greenlight with Valadares announcing a future free-to-play version of the game for download. He planned to include features in the Steam version not available in the browser version, including additional gamemodes, custom styling, and an account system. It was approved for listing on Steam due to community interest; however, the announced game has yet to be released, as the Greenlight program was shut down in June 2017. 

On 24 July 2015, Miniclip published a mobile version of Agar.io for iOS and Android. Sergio Varanda, head of mobile at Miniclip, explained that the main goal of the mobile version was to "recreate the gaming experience" on mobile, citing the challenges with recreating the game on touchscreen controls.

Reception
Agar.io was released to a positive critical reception. Particular praise was given to the simplicity, competition, and mechanics of the game. Engadget described the game as "a good abstraction of the fierce survival-of-the-fittest competition that you sometimes see on the microscopic level." Toucharcade praised its simplicity, strategic element, and "personality".

Criticism was mainly targeted towards its repetitiveness and the controls of the mobile version. Tom Christiansen of Gamezebo was mixed on the game, saying that there was "nothing to hold my attention" and that it was "highly repetitive, overall". Pocket Gamer, reviewing the mobile version, described its controls as "floaty".

Because it was frequently propagated through social media and broadcast on Twitch and YouTube, Agar.io was a quick success. The agar.io website (for the browser version) was ranked by Alexa as one of the 1,000 most visited websites and the mobile versions were downloaded more than ten million times during their first week, and 113 million times as of December 2016. During 2015, Agar.io was Google's most searched video game. It was Google's second-most searched game in the United States in 2016. A 2015 press release by Miniclip stated that Agar.io was listed as the fifth top game on YouTube's list of top games.

Agar.io has inspired similar web games called ".io games", including games with a similar objective but different characters, and games that incorporate elements of other genres like shooter games. Agar.io has also spawned several clone games with the same mechanics and theme, such as Senpa.io. Nebulous.io is a similar game released for mobile. Zorb.io has similar mechanics, although it is played in a three-dimensional plane.

During the campaigns of the June 2015 Turkish elections, Agar.io was used in Turkey as a medium of political advocacy; many players were naming their cells after Turkish political parties and references, with alliances formed between players with similar political views, battling against other players with opposing views. Some political parties have used Agar.io in campaign posters as a symbol of support.

Agar.io was featured, including some details of its gameplay, which was compared to the presidential campaigning, as well as a shot of an actual game, in episode 48 (Chapter 48) of Netflix TV-series House of Cards.

Agar.io is credited with starting the ".io game" genre, featuring games that are generally simple, yet addictive. Slither.io was the second .io game ever released, followed by Wings.io, Diep.io, and so on. Today, there are hundreds, if not thousands of .io games in existence.

See also 
 Diep.io (another game developed by Matheus Valadares)
 Slither.io

Notes

References

External links
 

2015 video games
Action video games
Android (operating system) games
Browser games
Free-to-play video games
IOS games
Multiplayer video games
Video games developed in Brazil
Casual games
Social casual games
Battle royale games
.io video games
Browser-based multiplayer online games
Video games about microbes